Carles Pérez Sayol (born 16 February 1998) is a Spanish professional footballer who plays as a right winger for La Liga club Celta, on loan from Roma.

Club career

Barcelona
Born in Granollers, Barcelona, Catalonia, Pérez joined FC Barcelona's youth setup in 2012, from RCD Espanyol. On 3 October 2015, while still a youth, he made his senior debut with the reserves by coming on as a second-half substitute for Maxi Rolón in a 0–0 Segunda División B away draw against Levante UD B.

In July 2017, Pérez was promoted to the B-side, now in Segunda División. He made his professional debut on 19 August 2017, replacing Vitinho in a 2–1 away win against Real Valladolid.

Pérez scored his first professional goals on 21 January 2018, netting a hat-trick in a 3–1 away defeat of CD Tenerife. On 12 June, after suffering relegation with the reserve side, he renewed his contract for two further years.

Pérez made his first team – and La Liga – debut on 19 May 2019, replacing Malcom in a 2–2 away draw against SD Eibar. He scored his first goal for the Blaugrana on 25 August, scoring his team's third in a 5–2 home routing of Real Betis. He scored his first UEFA Champions League goal as the opener in a 2–1 away victory against Inter Milan.

Roma
On 30 January 2020, Pérez left Barcelona for Italian side Roma, in a loan move with the obligation to purchase his rights permanently for a fee of €11 million in the summer. He scored his first UEFA Europa League goal in a 1–0 home victory against Gent in the Round of 32. He scored his first Serie A goal in a 6–1 away win against SPAL.

On 8 August 2022, Pérez returned to his home country after agreeing to a loan move to RC Celta de Vigo.

Personal life 
On 27 August 2020 he tested positive for COVID-19.

Career statistics

Club

Honours
Roma
 UEFA Europa Conference League: 2021–22

Barcelona
La Liga: 2018–19
UEFA Youth League: 2017–18

References

External links
FC Barcelona official profile

1998 births
Living people
Footballers from Granollers
Spanish footballers
Association football wingers
La Liga players
Serie A players
Segunda División players
Segunda División B players
CF Damm players
FC Barcelona players
FC Barcelona Atlètic players
A.S. Roma players
RC Celta de Vigo players
Spain youth international footballers
Spain under-21 international footballers
Spanish expatriate footballers
Expatriate footballers in Italy
Spanish expatriate sportspeople in Italy
UEFA Europa Conference League winning players